Positive is the thirteenth studio album by American singer Peabo Bryson. It was released in January 1988 by Elektra Records. The album peaked at number 157 on the US Billboard 200 and number 42 on the Billboard R&B albums chart. This was the last album Bryson recorded for Elektra before he briefly returned to Capitol Records. Positive was supported by the single "Without You".

Critical reception

Ron Wynn of AllMusic called Positive "largely undistinguished, although [Bryson] sang with more conviction and got better material and production than on most of his other Elektra albums. He scored another hit with a familiar weapon: the duet. This time his partner was Regina Belle."

Track listing

Personnel and credits 
Musicians

 Peabo Bryson – lead vocals, keyboards (4, 5, 8, 9), arrangements (4, 5, 8, 9)
 Gary Barlough – Synclavier programming (1, 2, 3, 6, 7, 10)
 Dean Gant – keyboards (1, 7), Synclavier (1, 2, 3, 6, 7, 10), synth bass (1, 7), arrangements (1, 2, 3, 6, 7, 10), acoustic piano (2), synthesizers (2-6, 10), BGV arrangements (10)
 Vernon Fails – electric piano (2)
 George Martin – keyboards (4, 5, 8, 9), computer programming (4, 5, 8, 9)
 Dwight W. Watkins – keyboards (4, 5, 8, 9), bass (4, 5, 8, 9), computer programming (4, 5, 8, 9), backing vocals (4, 5, 8, 9), arrangements (4, 5, 8, 9)
 Michael J. Powell – guitars (1, 2, 3, 6, 7, 10), arrangements (1, 2, 3, 6, 7, 10), BGV arrangements (7, 10)
 Anthony Jackson – bass (2)
 Neil Stubenhaus – bass (3)
 Nathan East – bass (10)
 Vinnie Colaiuta – drums (1, 7, 10)
 Steve Ferrone – drums (2)
 Jonathan Moffett – drums (3)
 Paulinho da Costa – percussion (1, 7, 10)
 Brandon Fields – saxophone solo (1, 6, 7, 10)
 Justo Almario – saxophone solo (3)
 George Del Barrio – string arrangements (2)
 Keni Burke – backing vocals (1, 7, 10), BGV arrangements (1, 7)
 Brenda Jones Williams – backing vocals (1, 4, 5, 7-10)
 Shirley Jones – backing vocals (1, 7, 10)
 Regina Belle – lead vocals (2)
 Jim Gilstrap – backing vocals (2, 6)
 Bunny Hull – backing vocals (2, 6)
 Marva King – backing vocals (2, 6)
 Cindy Mizelle – backing vocals (2), BGV arrangements (2)
 Valerie Pinkston – backing vocals (2, 6)
 Charles Bryson – backing vocals (4, 5, 8, 9)
 Myra Walker – backing vocals (4, 5, 8, 9)

Production

 Dean Gant – producer (1, 2, 3, 6, 7, 10)
 Michael J. Powell – producer (1, 2, 3, 6, 7, 10)
 Peabo Bryson – producer (4, 5, 8, 9)
 Dwight W. Watkins – producer (4, 5, 8, 9)
 Barney Perkins – engineer (1, 2, 3, 6, 7, 10), recording (2-6, 8, 9), mixing (2-6, 8, 9)
 Greg Townley – additional recording (1, 7, 10)
 Tom Wright – additional recording (1, 7, 10), recording (4, 5, 8, 9)
 Fred Law – additional recording (2, 3, 6)
 Keith Seppenen – additional recording (2, 3, 6)
 Milton Chan – assistant engineer (1, 2, 3, 6, 7, 10)
 Andy Harper – assistant engineer (1, 7, 10)
 Elliott Peters – assistant engineer (1, 2, 3, 6, 7, 10)
 Andrew Spiegelman – assistant engineer (2, 3, 6)
 Gerard Smerek – assistant engineer (2, 3, 6)
 Tom Kidd – recording (4, 5, 8, 9)
 Barry Leff – assistant engineer (4, 5, 8, 9)
 Steve McCormick – assistant engineer (4, 5, 8, 9)
 Lewis Padgett – assistant engineer (4, 5, 8, 9)
 Bernie Grundman – mastering 
 Carol Bobolts – art direction, design 
 Gilles Larrain – photography 
 David M. Franklin – management

Studios

 Recorded at Cheshire Sound Studios (Atlanta, Georgia); Ambience Recorders (Farmington Hills, Michigan); Yamaha R & D Studio (Glendale, California); Electric Lady Studios (New York City, New York).
 Mixed at Yamaha R & D Studio.
 Mastered at Bernie Grundman Mastering (Hollywood, California).

Charts

References 

1988 albums
Peabo Bryson albums
Albums produced by Michael J. Powell